UMK may refer to:

Universities

 Nicolaus Copernicus University in Toruń in Poland
 Universiti Malaysia Kelantan in Malaysia
 University of Mediterranean Karpasia in Cyprus
 Mihail Kogălniceanu University of Iași in Romania

Other organisations
 TV Miyazaki, a Japanese TV station

Events
 Uuden Musiikin Kilpailu, a musical competition in Finland